This is a list of episodes of the television series Archie Bunker's Place.

Series overview

Episodes

Season 1 (1979–80)

Season 2 (1980–81)

Season 3 (1981–82)

Season 4 (1982–83)

See also
List of All in the Family episodes

Sources
 
 
 DVD release info at TVShowsOnDVD.com

References

Archie Bunker's Place